The Mishnah consists of six divisions known as Sedarim or Orders. The Babylonian Talmud has Gemara — rabbinical analysis of and commentary on the Mishnah — on thirty-seven masekhtot. The Jerusalem Talmud (Yerushalmi) has Gemara on thirty-nine masekhtot. The Talmud is the central text of Rabbinic Judaism and the primary source of Jewish religious law (halakha) and Jewish theology.

Structure 
Every printed masekhet (tractate) of Talmud Bavli begins on page 2 (with the exception of Middot, Tamid and Kinnim), making the actual page count one less than the numbers below. 

While Talmud Bavli has had a standardized page count for over 100 years based on the Vilna edition, the standard page count of the Yerushalmi found in most modern scholarly literature is based on the first printed edition (Venice 1523) which uses folio (#) and column number (a,b,c,and d; eg. Berachot 2d would be folio page 2, column 4). A modern alternative page count and numbering system has existed for the Yerushalmi for about 10 years since Oz Vehadar put out a new standardized edition, and it is used in the table which follows.

Masechtot Shekalim, Middot and Kinnim are printed in the editions of the Babylonian Talmud despite there not being Babylonian Talmud gemara.

See also 
 Mishnah
 Talmud

References 

 
 
Oral Torah
Judaism-related lists